Caryanda modesta is a species of grasshoppers in the tribe Oxyini, found in the Congo Basin.

References

External links 

 Caryanda modesta at orthoptera.speciesfile.org

modesta
Insects described in 1907
Taxa named by Ermanno Giglio-Tos